The Mysterious Caravan is Volume 54 in the original The Hardy Boys Mystery Stories published by Grosset & Dunlap.

This book was written for the Stratemeyer Syndicate by Andrew E. Svenson in 1975.

Plot summary
On a winter vacation in Jamaica, the Hardy Boys begin a dangerous adventure when an ancient bronze death mask is discovered near their beach house (where Frank comically loses and finds his underwear). The case takes them from Jamaica to their hometown of Bayport to Casablanca to Marrakesh. They meet William along the way, a kind African who is willing to help them uncover secrets of the mask, which they find out is Jamaican property.

William scares off the enemies of the Hardy Boys in Swahili, telling them he is an even more powerful Juju man then theirs and eventually Mr. Hardy comes after Frank and Joe thought he was dead. Back at the Celliers', they celebrate and Christine, the gorgeous, black-haired teen who also assisted them in solving the case lets the Hardys call home to their worrying mother and eats dinner with Aunt Gertrude.  William even receives a Basenji dog as a present for saving the Hardys from the predicament.

Main characters
Joe Hardy-The son of Fenton Hardy and a popular, hard-hitting detective. He solves cases with his brother, Frank.

Frank Hardy-The son of Fenton Hardy and a popular, hard-hitting detective. But unfortunately Frank had a lot of trust issues with Joe. He solves cases with his brother, Joe.

Includes many friends of Joe and Frank Hardy

Callie Shaw - Iola Morton's best friend and Frank's girlfriend

Iola Morton-Joe's girlfriend and Chet's sister.

Chet Morton-Chet is Frank and Joe's plump friend. He helps them solve the case of the Mysterious Caravan.

William Ellis- a Jamaican who Joe and Frank meets while holidaying in Jamaica. He is kidnapped by Fenton's old enemies unless the Hardys and they can negotiate. William knows much of Jamaican history, including the mask's itself.

Mrs. Morton-Chet, Iola and Chet's mother.

Mr. Morton-Chet, Iola and Chet's father.

Fenton Hardy-Joe and Frank's father. Joe and Frank inherited his intellect and followed their father, but for their own reasons.

Mrs. Hardy-Joe and Frank's mother. She does not specialize in cases.

Gertrude Hardy-Fenton's sister. She has a knack for solving cases, identical to her brother and though proud of him and her nephews' abilities, lectures them about dangers of being detectives.

Christine Cellier-A unbelievably gorgeous, black-haired teen who is the daughter of Mr. and Mrs. Cellier. She helps the Hardys and Chet solve the Mysterious Caravan mystery.

Mrs. Cellier-Mother of Christine Cellier.

Mr. Henri Cellier-Father of Christine Cellier. He raised her well and is also a professor.

References

The Hardy Boys books
1975 American novels
1975 children's books
Novels set in Jamaica
Novels set in Morocco
Grosset & Dunlap books